Alireza Ghaderi (born 16 February 2000) is an Iranian footballer who plays as a right winger who currently plays for Iranian club Zob Ahan in the Persian Gulf Pro League.

Club career

Zob Ahan
He made his debut for Zob Ahan in 5th fixtures of 2018–19 Iran Pro League against Machine Sazi while he substituted in for Mohammadreza Abbasi.

References

2000 births
Living people
Iranian footballers
Zob Ahan Esfahan F.C. players
Association football forwards